Yeon-hee is a Korean feminine given name. Its meaning differs based on the hanja used to write each syllable of the name. There are 31 hanja with the reading "yeon" and 24 hanja with the reading "hee" on the South Korean government's official list of hanja which may be used in given names.  

People with this name include:
Maria Yi Yonhui, one of the Joseon Dynasty Roman Catholic Korean Martyrs
Cha Yun-hee (born 1986), South Korean football player 
Lee Yeon-hee (born 1988), South Korean actress
Jong Yon-hui (born 1989), North Korean synchronised swimmer

See also
List of Korean given names

References

Korean feminine given names